The Vileshchay  is a river of Azerbaijan. It is one of the larger rivers of the country, flowing into the Caspian Sea in southeastern Azerbaijan.

Overview
Vilesh is a part of Gizil-Agach State Reserve, an ecological haven for migrating birds, created in 1929. It starts at  Quludaş peak of Talysh Mountains. In the middle it additionally branches off to Şərətük river on its right (29 km long), Mətəli river on the left (21 km long). The river is considered to be one of the wildest bodies of water in the country flooding the nearby villages during the rain season. It goes through Yardymli Rayon and Masally Rayon in the Kur-Araz Lowland area. The bigger part of the river is contributed by the rainfall (70%) and the rest derives from underground waters (20%) and melting snow in the mountains (10%). The river has a tendency to overflow from October to May on annual basis due to heavy rainfall.

Water usage
Vileshchay has healing minerals in the natural spring within which are a cure to skin deceases. The waters from Vileshchay are heavily used for arrogation purposes.
Vileshchay flows into a natural Vileshchay Reservoir. The reservoir's volume is  that making the riverside locations in Masally a major attraction for tourists and therefore becoming a place of many hotels and resorts.

See also
Tourism in Azerbaijan

References

Rivers of Azerbaijan
Tributaries of the Caspian Sea